Bellak is a surname. Notable people with the surname include:

 George Bellak (1919–2002), American television writer
 James Bellak (1813–1891), American musician
 Laszlo Bellak (1911–2006), Hungarian table tennis player
 Leopold Bellak (1916–2000), American psychologist

Hungarian-language surnames